Lloyd Webber Plays Lloyd Webber is a 1989 album by British cellist Julian Lloyd Webber interpreting songs written by his older brother, the popular musical theatre composer Andrew Lloyd Webber. The album was recorded with the Royal Philharmonic Orchestra conducted by Barry Wordsworth. The album primarily featured classical musicians with the notable exception of Rod Argent of The Zombies.

Track listing
 "No Matter What" from Whistle Down the Wind
 "The Music of the Night" from The Phantom of the Opera
 "Memory" from Cats
 "Don't Cry for Me Argentina" from Evita
 "Our Kind of Love" from The Beautiful Game
 "With One Look" from Sunset Boulevard
 "I Don't Know How to Love Him" from Jesus Christ Superstar
 "Starlight Express" from the musical of the same name
 "Buenos Aires" from Evita
 "Love Changes Everything" from Aspects of Love
 "The Perfect Year" from Sunset Boulevard
 "All I Ask of You" from The Phantom of the Opera
 "God's Own Country" from The Beautiful Game
 "Tell Me on a Sunday" from Song and Dance
 "Variations 1–4" from Variations
 "Close Every Door" from Joseph and the Amazing Technicolor Dreamcoat
 "John 19:41" from Jesus Christ Superstar
 "Pie Jesu" from Requiem
 "Whistle Down the Wind" from the musical of the same name

References

External links
 
  of Julian Lloyd Webber playing "Music of the Night"
  of Sarah Chang (violin) and Julian Lloyd Webber playing "All I Ask of You"
  of Julian Lloyd Webber playing Variations

1989 albums
Andrew Lloyd Webber
Julian Lloyd Webber albums
Royal Philharmonic Orchestra albums
Tribute albums